Santiago Urrutia Lausarot (born 30 August 1996) is a Uruguayan racing driver. He currently competes in the World Touring Car Cup, driving for Cyan Performance Lynk & Co. He formerly competed in Indy Lights, and was the 2015 Pro Mazda series champion.

Racing career

Karting and junior formulae
Urrutia's motorsport career started at age three in dirt motorcycling on his grandfather's farm, and later moved up to go-kart racing in his native Uruguay at age five. In 2009 he won the Argentine Pre Junior Championship and the Metropolitan Mini Junior Apertura Championship. In 2010 he won the Uruguayan Master Championship.

At the 2010 Karting World Championship, he qualified 5th for the pre-final, but was involved in two incidents and finished the final in 18th place. At age 14, Urrutia moved it Italy in 2011 and competed at the WSK Euro Series KF3. Also in 2011 he took part in the Formula Abarth season. He won Formula Abarth Rookie of the year in 2012, and participated in the Ferrari Diving Academy.

In 2013 he took part in the European F3 Open Championship, winning races at Algarve International Circuit and Silverstone Circuit. In 2014, he competed in the GP3 Series for Finnish team Koiranen GP.

Road to Indy

He took part in the Pro Mazda Championship in 2015 as a driver for Team Pelfrey. He clinched the championship at Mazda Raceway Laguna Seca, sixteen years and one day after the death of fellow Uruguayan Gonzalo Rodríguez in a practice accident at the same venue. With the championship, Urrutia became the first Uruguayan to win a major international racing championship.

In 2016, he competed in Indy Lights for Schmidt Peterson Motorsports. He was placed on probation by the series in June. A weekend sweep at the Mid-Ohio Sports Car Course in July led Urrutia to the top of the point standings. Urrutia was in the hunt for the series title until the final pair of races of the season, where he ultimately lost the championship to Ed Jones by two points after Jones' teammate let him by to win the title. With SPM discontinuing their Indy Lights team, Urrutia returned to the series in 2017 as a Belardi Auto Racing driver. He scored two wins and six second place finishes, finishing runner-up in the standings to Kyle Kaiser.

At the end of 2017, Urrutia entered into a handshake deal to drive the 2018 IndyCar Series season for Harding Racing, but the team eventually rescinded on the offer and failed to pay Urrutia a $100,000 sum for the driver to compete with Belardi in Indy Lights for the season. He did, however, run a full Indy Lights season with Belardi in 2018.

Touring cars
In 2019, Urrutia raced in the European TCR series for Team WRT, finishing third in the standings and earning Rookie of the Year.

He was due to return to the Indy Lights with HMD Motorsport in 2020, but the season was cancelled due to the impact of the COVID-19 pandemic in the United States. Instead, he contested the opening round of the Formula Regional Americas Championship in its place, scoring a podium finish. The Uruguayan then took part in a test for Cyan Racing's World Touring Car Cup team, and was later signed for their 2020 campaign alongside Thed Björk.

In 2020, Urrutia competed the whole of the championship for the Cyan Performance Lynk & Co team, ending up in 6th place in the standings. He had a number of podiums and won the last race of the season.

In 2021 he continued to compete for the same team in WTCR. He won two races and had three other podium finishes, ending the championship in 5th place. He also did some races in the South American TCR championship.

In 2022 he remained with the same team for his third year in the series.

Racing record

Career summary

* Season still in progress.

Complete GP3 Series results
(key) (Races in bold indicate pole position) (Races in italics indicate fastest lap)

American open-wheel racing results

Pro Mazda Championship

Indy Lights

Complete TCR Europe Touring Car Series results
(key) (Races in bold indicate pole position) (Races in italics indicate fastest lap)

Complete World Touring Car Cup results
(key) (Races in bold indicate pole position) (Races in italics indicate fastest lap)

References

External links
 
 

1996 births
Living people
People from Colonia Department
Uruguayan racing drivers
Formula Abarth drivers
Euroformula Open Championship drivers
GP3 Series drivers
Indy Pro 2000 Championship drivers
Indy Lights drivers
World Touring Car Cup drivers
Súper TC 2000 drivers
Formula Regional Americas Championship drivers
BVM Racing drivers
RP Motorsport drivers
Koiranen GP drivers
Team Pelfrey drivers
Belardi Auto Racing drivers
W Racing Team drivers
Arrow McLaren SP drivers
Karting World Championship drivers
TCR Europe Touring Car Series drivers
HMD Motorsports drivers